Dalla agathocles is a species of butterfly in the family Hesperiidae. It is found in Venezuela, Colombia, Ecuador and Peru.

Subspecies
Dalla agathocles agathocles (Colombia)
Dalla agathocles lanna Evans, 1955 (Ecuador)
Dalla agathocles lonia Evans, 1955 (Peru)
Dalla agathocles polydesma (Mabille, 1889) (Venezuela)

References

Butterflies described in 1867
agathocles
Hesperiidae of South America
Taxa named by Baron Cajetan von Felder
Taxa named by Rudolf Felder